Fashion Model is a 1945 comedy mystery film directed by William Beaudine, starring Robert Lowery, Marjorie Weaver, and Tim Ryan, and written by Victor Hammond and Tim Ryan.

The film is considered to be the third in a series of Beaudine films featuring a female detective after Detective Kitty O'Day (1944) and Adventures of Kitty O'Day (1944).

Plot
When a prominent fashion model is murdered, a stockboy accused of the crime must clear his name, working with another model.

Cast
Robert Lowery as Jimmy O'Brien
Marjorie Weaver as Peggy Rooney
Tim Ryan as O'Hara
Lorna Gray as Yvonne Brewster
Dorothy Christy as Madame Celeste
Dewey Robinson as Grogan
Sally Yarnell as Marie Lewis
Jack Norton as Herbert
Harry Depp as Harvey Van Allen
Nell Craig as Jessica Van Allen
Edward Keane as Jacques Duval
John Valentine as Davis

Release
The 61 minute film premiered on March 2, 1945.The Motion Picture Guide called it "light but entertaining".

References

External links
 

1945 films
Monogram Pictures films
American comedy mystery films
1940s comedy mystery films
1940s crime comedy films
Films about fashion
Films directed by William Beaudine
American crime comedy films
American black-and-white films
1945 comedy films
1940s English-language films
1940s American films